In Greek mythology, Rarus (Ancient Greek: Ρᾶρος) or Rar (Ρᾶρ) was a son of Cranaus, eponym of the Rharian Field near Eleusis, and a possible father of Triptolemus by an unnamed daughter of Amphictyon. According to Suda, Rarus was the father of Celeus and through him grandfather of Triptolemus. He received Demeter hospitably as she was searching for her daughter Persephone, and the goddess, in reward, taught his grandson the art of cultivating crops. According to Robert Graves, Rarus name whether it means ‘an abortive child’, or ‘a womb’, is an inappropriate name for a king, and will have referred to the womb of the Corn-mother from which the corn sprang.

Notes

References 

 Graves, Robert, The Greek Myths: The Complete and Definitive Edition. Penguin Books Limited. 2017. 
Pausanias, Description of Greece with an English Translation by W.H.S. Jones, Litt.D., and H.A. Ormerod, M.A., in 4 Volumes. Cambridge, MA, Harvard University Press; London, William Heinemann Ltd. 1918. . Online version at the Perseus Digital Library
 Pausanias, Graeciae Descriptio. 3 vols. Leipzig, Teubner. 1903.  Greek text available at the Perseus Digital Library.
 Suida, Suda Encyclopedia translated by Ross Scaife, David Whitehead, William Hutton, Catharine Roth, Jennifer Benedict, Gregory Hays, Malcolm Heath Sean M. Redmond, Nicholas Fincher, Patrick Rourke, Elizabeth Vandiver, Raphael Finkel, Frederick Williams, Carl Widstrand, Robert Dyer, Joseph L. Rife, Oliver Phillips and many others. Online version at the Topos Text Project.

Attican characters in Greek mythology
Eleusinian mythology